Alliance of the Forces of Progress may refer to:
Alliance of the Forces of Progress (Benin)
Alliance of the Forces of Progress (Senegal)